Ghazab  is a 1982 Indian Hindi-language action comedy-drama film starring Dharmendra and Rekha. The film was a remake of the Tamil film Kalyanaraman. The movie was a 'Hit' and the performance of Dharmendra was critically acclaimed.

Plot 
Ajay alias Munna Babu is a gentle but naïve young man who has a wealthy family estate. He keeps playing with Jamuna and Raju. His employees and alleged well-wishers (Arjun Singh, Jatha Shankar, Munishi Gurbachan, Bhairav) conspire against him and murder his father. His father tells him that his real mother and brother Vijay live in Bombay before he dies. His employees introduce him to his long-estranged mother, Laxmi, and brother, Vijay. Munna is overjoyed, not knowing that they are impersonators. This joy is quite short-lived, as they soon show their true colors, and Munna gets killed. His restless spirit seeks out his real brother and appeals to him to avenge his death. Vijay, at first, thinks he is hallucinating, but when his mother confirms that he indeed had a twin brother, he agrees to accompany Munna's spirit back to where he was killed, and thus assist him complete his vengeance. Jamuna and Raju help Vijay to get revenge. Things do not go as planned, and Vijay himself becomes their victim, and may face the very same fate as Munna.

Cast 
 Dharmendra as Ajay "Munna" / Vijay (Double Role)
 Rekha as Jamuna
 Ranjeet as Arjun Singh
 Madan Puri as Jatashankar
 Aruna Irani as Kaveri
 Jagdeep as Narmada
 Shreeram Lagoo as Thakur
 Praveen Kumar as Henchman

Soundtrack

References

External links 
 

1982 films
1980s Hindi-language films
Films scored by Laxmikant–Pyarelal
Hindi remakes of Tamil films